Breaking Silence is an album by singer-songwriter Janis Ian, released in 1993 on Morgan Creek Records in the United States and Europe and on Columbia in Canada and the Netherlands.

History
Although Ian was outed as a lesbian in 1976 by the Village Voice, her sexuality was largely ignored until the release of Breaking Silence when Ian herself brought it to the forefront because of her concern with suicide rates among gay and lesbian teenagers.

In the preceding decade, Ian met Pat Snyder and, after significant financial and health setbacks, they purchased a house together by 1991. They took on a second mortgage to fund the album, as major record labels were no longer interested in Ian's work. "I thought I was only going to get one more chance to record, so I wanted to make it count", Ian said. It was her first album in 12 years.

The album contains political songs such as "His Hands" (about spousal abuse) and "Tattoo" (about the Holocaust). The title track, "Breaking Silence", is about incest. It also includes Ian's version of "Some People's Lives", previously recorded as the title track of Bette Midler's 1990 album. The album was nominated for a Grammy, making it Ian's seventh nomination.

Track listing

Personnel

Janis Ian – acoustic and electric guitar, piano, vocals
Jeff Balding – producer, lead engineer, mix engineer
Jim Brock – drums, percussion
Jim Hoke – harmonica
Chad Watson – bass
Dann Huff – electric guitar
Doug Sax – mastering
Lisa Powers – photography
Jerry Joyner – design
Virginia Team – art direction
Steve Bishir – assistant engineer
Patrick Kelly – assistant engineer, overdubs
Greg Parker – assistant engineer
John David Parker – assistant engineer
Christopher Rich – assistant engineer
Toby Seay – assistant engineer
Carry Summers – assistant engineer, overdubs

References

External links

Janis Ian albums
1993 albums